Freiburg (in High German, officially Freiburg an der Elbe; short: Freiburg/Elbe, Freiborg/Elv (in Low German), or Freiborg (in Low Saxon) is a municipality in the district of Stade, Lower Saxony, Germany.

History
 Freiburg belonged to the Prince-Archbishopric of Bremen, a territory of imperial immediacy established in 1180. In the mid-16th century Freiburg adopted Lutheranism. During the Leaguist occupation under Johan 't Serclaes, Count of Tilly (1628–1630), Freiburg suffered from attempts of re-Catholisation. 
    
In 1648 the prince-archbishopric was transformed into the Duchy of Bremen, which was first ruled in personal union by the Swedish and from 1715 on by the Hanoverian Crown. In 1807 the short-lived Kingdom of Westphalia annexed the duchy, before France annexed it in 1810. In 1813 the Duchy of Bremen was restored to the Electorate of Hanover, which - after its upgrade to the Kingdom of Hanover in 1814 - incorporated the duchy in a real union and the ducal territory, including Freiburg, became part of the Stade Region, established in 1823.

Notes

Stade (district)